Robert Anthony Phalen (May 10, 1937 – December 6, 1995) was an American actor who starred in films and on television.

Life and career
He was born in San Francisco, California on May 10, 1937, where he attended George Washington High School, was active in the school's drama club, and served as student body president.

His early stage work includes his membership in San Francisco's Actor's Workshop, where he played a variety of roles in the early 1960s, including Mick in Harold Pinter's The Caretaker.
He was in the 1978 hit horror movie Halloween as Dr. Terence Wynn. His character returned in the 1995 sequel Halloween: The Curse of Michael Myers, but the role was taken over by Mitch Ryan. Robert also appeared in two other John Carpenter movies; namely Someone's Watching Me! (1978) and Starman (1984). His other film credits include Three Days of the Condor (1975), Just You and Me, Kid (1979), Zoot Suit (1981), The Gladiator (1986) and Impulse (1990).

Phalen made guest appearances on many television shows, including MASH, Baretta, Centennial, Hill Street Blues, The Facts of Life, and Babylon 5 (as the father of main character Susan Ivanova).

He died from complications of AIDS in Los Angeles, California on December 6, 1995, at the age of 58.

Filmography

References

External links
 

1937 births
1995 deaths
20th-century American male actors
AIDS-related deaths in California
American male film actors
American male television actors
Male actors from San Francisco